Cainia desmazieri is a species of fungus in the family Cainiaceae. It was first described as a new species by Claude Moreau and Emil Müller in 1963, and then later validly published in 1978.

References

Fungi described in 1978
Xylariales